The Rousseeuw Prize for Statistics awards innovations in statistical research with impact on society. This biennial prize is awarded in even years, and consists of a medal, a certificate, and a monetary reward of US$1,000,000, similar to the Nobel Prize in other disciplines. The home institution of the Prize is the King Baudouin Foundation (KBF) in Belgium, which appoints the international jury and carries out the selection procedure. The award money comes from the Rousseeuw Foundation created by the statistician Peter Rousseeuw.

The first Rousseeuw Prize was awarded on October 12, 2022, at KU Leuven, presented by His Majesty King Philippe of Belgium. The awarded topic was Causal Inference with application in Medicine and Public Health, with laureates James Robins, Andrea Rotnitzky, Thomas Richardson, Miguel Hernán and Eric Tchetgen Tchetgen.

Laureates 

Nominations for the prize are submitted to its website together with letters of recommendation. The organizers of the prize and its ceremony are Mia Hubert and Stefan Van Aelst.

See also 

 International Prize in Statistics
 COPSS Presidents' Award

References

External links
The Rousseeuw Prize for Statistics, official site
The King Baudouin Foundation, official site

Belgian awards
Statistical awards